Rotalia may refer to:
Rotalia, the Latin name for Lääne County, Estonia
Rotalia (corporation), an Estonian student corporation
Rotalia (genus), a genus of amoeboid protists in the order Rotaliida